Who I Am is the second studio album by Canadian country rock artist Cory Marks, and was released on August 7, 2020 through Better Noise Music. It includes the singles "Outlaws and Outsiders", "Drive" and "Blame It on the Double".

Background
Marks spent five years co-writing and recording the songs for this album with producer Kevin Churko. Marks frequently travelled from his hometown North Bay, Ontario to Churko's studio "The Hideout" in Las Vegas, Nevada to work on the album.

Critical reception
Dave Brooks of Billboard referred to the album as the "Long Awaited Next Generation Country Rock Record". Nanci Dagg of Canadian Beats Media said of Marks and the album: "his style is outlaw country/country rock and he pulls it off like no other. He has a boisterous sound and unique style that will always impress those who have come to know him and his music". Rock 'N' Load Magazine said the "album is packed with a gnarly backbone and beautiful melodies intertwined right across the thirteen fine recordings". Andy Morley of Maximum Volume Music stated the album is "for the good ol’ boys, [it's] never meaning no harm, oh and it's going to take over the world.  See, a college hockey player, and a pilot he might have been, but these days Cory Marks is about to break out as a big star.

Singles
Marks released his first single on Better Noise Music, "Outlaws & Outsiders", featuring Ivan Moody, Travis Tritt, and Mick Mars, in November of 2019. It debuted at #1 on iTunes in Canada as well as #1 on the Billboard Rock Digital Songs and Hard Rock Digital Songs charts and #7 on the Country Digital Songs charts and would later peak inside the top 10 on US Mainstream Rock radio, top 5 on German rock radio, and at #12 on Canada Rock radio.

Marks released three promotional singles, "Better Off", "Blame It on the Double", and "Devil's Grin", prior to officially announcing the album.

In June 2020, Marks released "Drive", and announced it as the second single to country radio off the simultaneously announced album.

"Blame It on the Double" became the album’s second single to rock radio in Germany and the United Kingdom in October 2020. A later version of the song featuring Tyler Connolly of Theory of a Deadman was sent to Canadian country radio, while another version featuring Connolly and Jason Hook was sent to Canadian rock radio.

Track listing

Personnel
Adapted from the album liner notes.

Scotty Alexander - electric guitar, acoustic guitar, fiddle, banjo
Jay Buettner - electric guitar
Kane Churko - electric guitar, acoustic guitar, keys, production, engineering
Kevin Churko - electric guitar, acoustic guitar, mandolin, bass guitar, keys, drums, production, engineering, mixing, mastering
Khloe Churko - studio assistance
Jody Domingue - photography
Alex Donaldson - electric guitar
Joel Ferguson - steel guitar, slide guitar
Bob Funk - electric guitar, acoustic guitar, mandolin, banjo
Tristin Hardin - editing
Lzzy Hale - featured vocals on "Out in the Rain"
Shane Hendrickson - bass guitar
Cory Marks - lead vocals, acoustic guitar, drums
Mick Mars - electric guitar on "Outlaws & Outsiders"
Shawn McGhee - editing
Ivan Moody - featured vocals on "Outlaws & Outsiders"
Marc Muller - electric guitar, steel guitar, slide guitar
Ed Regan - photography
Travis Tritt - featured vocals on "Outlaws & Outsiders"
Justin Schipper - steel guitar, slide guitar
Adam Wakeman - organ
John Wellman - artwork

Charts

Album

Singles

Awards and nominations

Release history

References

2020 albums
Cory Marks albums
Country rock albums